Neals Creek is a stream in southern Iron County in the U.S. state of Missouri. It is a tributary of Strother Creek.

The confluence is about 1000 feet north of the Iron-Reynolds county line.
 
Neals Creek has the name of Valentine Neal, a pioneer citizen.

See also
List of rivers of Missouri

References

Rivers of Iron County, Missouri
Rivers of Missouri